Ferid Rragami (born 1 June 1957), is an Albanian retired footballer.

Club career
Rragami played for Shkëndija Tiranë, Vllaznia Shkodër and Partizani Tirana between 1972 and 1988, winning three league titles and 2 domestic cups.

Suspension
In November 1987, Rragami's playing career was more or less ended by the communist regime, who suspended him for two years for his role in the defection of Vllaznia players Lulëzim Bërshemi and Arvid Hoxha in Helsinki after a European tie with Finnish side Rovaniemi PS. He was punished to forced labour in Pult alongside team manager Bahri Aqemi, head coach Astrit Hafizi and club doctor Zyhdi Çoba.

International career
He made his debut for Albania in a September 1980 World Cup qualification match against Finland in Tirana and earned a total of 14 caps, scoring no goals. His final international was a March 1985 friendly match against Turkey.

Honours
Albanian Superliga: 3
 1979, 1981, 1983

Albanian Cup: 2
 1980, 1987

References

External links

1957 births
Living people
Association football midfielders
Albanian footballers
Albania under-23 international footballers
Albania international footballers
Shkëndija Tiranë players
KF Vllaznia Shkodër players
FK Partizani Tirana players
Kategoria Superiore players
Kategoria e Parë players